The 1950 LFF Lyga was the 29th season of the LFF Lyga football competition in Lithuania.  It was contested by 16 teams, and Inkaras Kaunas won the championship.

Group I

Group II

Final

References
RSSSF

LFF Lyga seasons
1950 in Lithuanian sport
Lith